The putative holin-like toxin (Hol-Tox) family (TC# 1.E.42) consists of many small proteins, between 34 and 48 amino acyl residues (aas) with a single transmembrane segment (TMSs). Rajesh et al. (2011) first identified the gene and designated it tmp1, which coded for a 34 amino acyl peptide that acts as an antibacterial agent on gram-positive bacteria. This peptide exhibits a single transmembrane domain (TMD) that is believed to play a role in facilitating the antibacterial activity. A representative list of proteins belonging to the Hol-Tox family can be found in the Transporter Classification Database.

See also 
 Holin
 Lysin

Further reading

References 

Protein families
Membrane proteins
Transmembrane proteins
Transmembrane transporters
Transport proteins
Integral membrane proteins
Holins